Simone Ponzi (born 17 January 1987, in Manerbio) is an Italian road bicycle racer, who last rode for UCI Professional Continental Team . He turned professional in 2009.

Ponzi left  at the end of the 2013 season, and joined  for the 2014 season.

Major results

2006
 5th Trofeo Banca Popolare di Vicenza
2007
 1st  Road race, National Road Championships
 1st Trofeo Zsšdi
 1st Trofeo Franco Balestra
 4th Gran Premio San Giuseppe
 7th Gran Premio Palio del Recioto
2008
 1st Giro del Casentino
 1st Stage 6 Giro della Valle d'Aosta
 2nd  Road race, UCI Under-23 Road World Championships
 5th Trofeo Alcide Degasperi
 9th Giro Ciclistico del Cigno
2009
 5th Memorial Marco Pantani
 10th Rund um die Nürnberger Altstadt
2010
 6th Giro della Romagna
 9th Gran Premio Città di Misano – Adriatico
2011
 1st Gran Premio Nobili Rubinetterie
 1st GP Kranj
 2nd Trofeo Laigueglia
 2nd Coppa Ugo Agostoni
 2nd Gran Premio Industria e Commercio Artigianato Carnaghese
 2nd Giro della Romagna
 3rd Road race, National Road Championships
 4th Vattenfall Cyclassics
 5th Gran Premio dell'Insubria-Lugano
 7th Grand Prix Cycliste de Québec
2012
 1st Stage 1 Tour of Slovenia
 10th Gran Piemonte
2013
 1st Stage 1 Vuelta a Burgos
 2nd Coppa Ugo Agostoni
 2nd Grand Prix Cycliste de Montréal
 3rd Gran Premio Nobili Rubinetterie
 5th Roma Maxima
 8th Coppa Bernocchi
 8th Tre Valli Varesine
2014
 1st Gran Premio della Costa Etruschi
 1st Dwars door Drenthe
 1st Gran Premio Nobili Rubinetterie
 3rd Coppa Bernocchi
 3rd Coppa Ugo Agostoni
 4th Giro dell'Appennino
 4th Gran Premio Industria e Commercio di Prato
 6th Memorial Marco Pantani
2015
 2nd Gran Premio Nobili Rubinetterie
 2nd GP Ouest–France
 4th Tre Valli Varesine
 4th Coppa Sabatini
 4th Gran Premio Bruno Beghelli
 7th Coppa Ugo Agostoni
 9th Trofeo Matteotti
 10th Gran Premio Industria e Commercio di Prato
2017
 5th Coppa Ugo Agostoni
 7th Overall Sibiu Cycling Tour

Grand Tour general classification results timeline

References

External links

1987 births
Living people
Italian male cyclists
Cyclists from the Province of Brescia